Aki Ogawa (born ) is a Japanese wheelchair curler.

She participated in the 2010 Winter Paralympics where Japanese team finished on tenth and fifth places respectively.

Teams

References

External links 

Profile at the Official Website for the 2010 Winter Paralympics in Vancouver

Living people
1975 births
Japanese female curlers
Japanese wheelchair curlers
Paralympic wheelchair curlers of Japan
Wheelchair curlers at the 2010 Winter Paralympics
20th-century Japanese women
21st-century Japanese women